Mazowiecki (femine: Mazowiecka) an adjective meaning "of Masovia" in Polish. It is translated into English as Masovian.

Mazowiecki or Mazowiecka may refer to:

People 
 Konrad I Mazowiecki (ca. 1187/88–1247), High Duke of Poland from the Polish Piast dynasty, the sixth Duke of Masovia and Kuyavia
 Stanisław Mazowiecki (1501–1524), Polish prince member of the House of Piast in the Masovian branch, Grand Chancellor of Lithuania
 Tadeusz Mazowiecki (1927–2013), Polish prime minister, one of the leaders of the Solidarity movement

Places in Poland 
 Nizina Mazowiecka
 Grodzisk Mazowiecki
 Maków Mazowiecki
 Mińsk Mazowiecki
 Nowy Dwór Mazowiecki
 Ostrów Mazowiecka
 Ożarów Mazowiecki
 Rawa Mazowiecka
 Tomaszów Mazowiecki